Nico Hug (born 26 October 1998) is a German professional footballer who plays as a left-back for Hallescher FC.

References

External links
 

Living people
1998 births
German footballers
Association football fullbacks
3. Liga players
Regionalliga players
Swiss Super League players
Swiss Challenge League players
SC Freiburg II players
FC Vaduz players
Hallescher FC players
German expatriate footballers
German expatriate sportspeople in Liechtenstein
Expatriate footballers in Liechtenstein